Hypleurochilus caudovittatus, the zebratail blenny, is a species of combtooth blenny found in the western central Atlantic ocean, in the Gulf of Mexico off the western coast of Florida.

References

caudovittatus
Fish of the Atlantic Ocean
Taxa named by Hans Bath
Fish described in 1994